Portrait of a Gentleman or Portrait of a Knight is a painting of 1618–1623 in oils on canvas by the Spanish artist Juan Bautista Maíno, in the Museo del Prado in Madrid.

It shows a knight, whose name is unknown, in a black doublet and cape and a large white ruff, lit from the side and shown three-quarter-length.

References 

Portraits by Spanish artists
17th-century portraits
Paintings of the Museo del Prado by Spanish artists
1610s paintings
Paintings by Juan Bautista Maíno
Portraits of men